Aboussy Cédric Gogoua Kouamé (born 10 July 1994) is an Ivorian professional footballer who plays as a centre-back.

Gogoua began his career at Sabé Sports de Bouna, but he did not break through and moved on to Africa Sports in 2010. Four years later, he joined Finnish club SJK. He was at the club two years and helped the club win the Veikkausliiga title for the first time in history. Gogoua was also named for best defender of Veikkausliiga in 2014. In January 2016, he signed for Serbian club Partizan.

Club career

Early career
Born in Abidjan, Gogoua started out his senior career with Africa Sports in early 2010, at the age of 15. He was then a member of the team that won the national league in 2011. Afterwards, Gogoua unexpectedly left the club in March 2012, allegedly going on a trial to Thailand. At that time he had been with the club for  three years, ever since he joined Africa Sports coming from Sabé Sports de Bouna.  He subsequently spent some time playing with Issia Wazy, before moving abroad to Finland.

SJK
In April 2014, after a successful trial at the club, Gogoua signed a permanent contract with SJK. He initially played for their reserve side Kerho 07, before being promoted to the main squad. Eventually, Gogoua made his debut for SJK on 17 May 2014, playing the full 90 minutes in a 3–0 home league win over IFK Mariehamn. He scored his first goal for the club in a 3–1 home league victory over MYPA on 25 October 2014. Due to his performances, Gogoua was named the league's best defender in 2014, as the club finished as runners-up to HJK. He subsequently helped them win the league in the following season, the first title in the club's history. Gogoua has played both matches in first qualifying round of 2015–16 UEFA Europa League against FH. In November 2015, Gogoua signed a one-year extension to his contract, keeping him at SJK until the end of 2017.

Partizan
On 17 January 2016, Gogoua officially joined Serbian club Partizan, penning a four-year deal and choosing the number 51 jersey for a fee of €300.000. He was joined by his compatriot, Ismaël Béko Fofana. On 27 February 2016, Gogoua made his official debut for the club in an Eternal derby against Red Star Belgrade and scored the leading goal for Partizan.
He was rumoured to have been arrested in Belgrade for driving under the influence of alcohol, after which he left the club and country abruptly.

Riga
On 24 January 2017, Gogoua joined Kazakhstan club Aktobe on trial.
At the end of the 2017 Latvian winter transfer window, Gogoua was listed as having joined Riga FC.

In June 2017, Gogoua went on trial with FC SKA-Khabarovsk, and then FC Rostov.

Kairat-A
In July 2017, Gogoua and Mohamed Konaté joined FC Kairat's academy side Kairat-A until the end of the 2017 season.

Kairat
On 13 November 2017, FC Kairat announced the signing of Gogoua on a two-year contract, with the option of an additional year.

SKA-Khabarovsk
On 24 August 2018, Gogoua signed with the Russian club FC SKA-Khabarovsk, but was released from his contract by mutual consent on 14 November 2018 without playing any league games for the team.

Tambov
For the 2019–20 season he joined Russian club FC Tambov. On his Russian Premier League debut on 27 July 2019 (which was also Tambov's first ever home Russian Premier League game), he scored the first goal in Tambov's 2–0 victory over FC Spartak Moscow. He scored again in his third game on 10 August, an away 2–2 draw against FC Orenburg.

CSKA Moscow
After just five games for Tambov, on 29 August 2019, Gogoua signed a 4-year contract with CSKA Moscow. On his CSKA debut on 1 September 2019, Gogoua scored the winning goal in a 2–1 away comeback victory over FC Arsenal Tula.

On 8 November 2021, Gogoua left CSKA by mutual consent.

Rotor Volgograd (loan)
On 5 August 2020, Gogoua joined Rotor Volgograd on a season-long loan deal from CSKA Moscow, without the option to make the move permanent.

Turan
On 20 February 2022, Kazakhstan Premier League club Turan announced the signing of Gogoua. In April 2022, Gogoua left Turan after failing to obtain a visa to work in Kazakhstan.

In February 2023, Gogoua went on trial with Tajikistan Higher League club Istiklol.

International career
Gogoua represented Ivory Coast at Under-17 and Under-20 level.

Style of play
Gogoua possesses the speed to keep track of smaller, quicker attackers while also possessing the strength needed to battle with more physical opponents. Also has a very good pass into space and game review, so he could play as defensive midfielder. While playing in the Finland, Gogoua has been one of the best players in Veikkausliiga and got a nickname Dominator.

Career statistics

Honours
Africa Sports
 Ligue 1: 2011

SJK
 Veikkausliiga: 2015

Partizan
Serbian Cup: 2015–16

Individual
 Veikkausliiga Best Defender: 2014

References

External links
 
 

1994 births
Living people
Ivorian footballers
Africa Sports d'Abidjan players
Association football defenders
Ivory Coast under-20 international footballers
Kakkonen players
Veikkausliiga players
Kazakhstan Premier League players
Russian Premier League players
Issia Wazy players
Seinäjoen Jalkapallokerho players
FK Partizan players
SJK Akatemia players
FC SKA-Khabarovsk players
BFC Daugavpils players
FC Tambov players
FC Kairat players
PFC CSKA Moscow players
FC Rotor Volgograd players
Ivorian expatriate footballers
Ivorian expatriate sportspeople in Finland
Expatriate footballers in Finland
Ivorian expatriate sportspeople in Serbia
Expatriate footballers in Serbia
Ivorian expatriate sportspeople in Kazakhstan
Expatriate footballers in Kazakhstan
Ivorian expatriate sportspeople in Russia
Expatriate footballers in Russia
Ivorian expatriate sportspeople in Latvia
Expatriate footballers in Latvia